Davis Milton Love Jr. (September 19, 1935 – November 14, 1988) was an American professional golfer. He finished tied for sixth place in the 1969 Open Championship and was the father of tour pro Davis Love III.

Love played college golf at the University of Texas in Austin under head coach Harvey Penick and spent most of his professional career as a golf pro and teaching professional.

Love was among four killed in a private plane crash while approaching Jacksonville International Airport through fog. He was inducted into the Georgia Golf Hall of Fame in 1991.

Professional wins
this list may be incomplete
1962 Carolinas PGA Championship
1964 Carolinas Open
1968 Georgia PGA Championship
1973 Georgia PGA Championship

Results in major championships

CUT = missed the half-way cut
"T" indicates a tie for a place

References

External links

American male golfers
Texas Longhorns men's golfers
Victims of aviation accidents or incidents in 1988
Victims of aviation accidents or incidents in the United States
1935 births
1988 deaths